Gloria Leonora McGehee (January 9, 1922 – May 4, 1964) was an American film and television actress. She starred in the films The Boss and Sierra Stranger, and guest-starred in three episodes of the western television series Gunsmoke and the episode "The Case of the Crimson Kiss" in the 1957 season of the legal drama series Perry Mason. McGehee died in May 1964 of a heart attack in Meadville, Mississippi, at the age of 42. She was buried in Midway Cemetery.

Partial filmography 

The Boss (1956) - Lorry Reed
Sierra Stranger (1957) - Meg Anderson
A Child Is Waiting (1963) - Mattie

References

External links 

Rotten Tomatoes profile

1922 births
1964 deaths
People from Meadville, Mississippi
Actresses from Mississippi
American film actresses
American television actresses
20th-century American actresses
Burials in Mississippi